Ida of Austria ( 1055 – September 1101) was a Margravine of Austria by marriage to Leopold II of Austria. She was a crusader, participating in the Crusade of 1101 with her own army.

Wife 
Ida was the daughter of Rapoto IV of Cham and Mathilde. She is also known as Itha. She married Leopold II of Austria and had a son, Leopold III. She was known as one of the great beauties of her day. 

In 1101, Ida, alongside Thiemo of Salzburg and the Bavarian dukes Welf IV and William IX, joined the Crusade of 1101, and raised and led her own army toward Jerusalem.

In September of that year, Ida and her army were among those ambushed at Heraclea Cybistra by the sultan Kilij Arslan I. Ekkehard of Aura reports that Ida was killed in the fighting, but rumors persisted that she survived, and was carried off to a harem, according to Albert von Aachen. Later legends claimed that she was the mother of the Muslim hero Zengi, as in Historia Welforum, but this is impossible on chronological grounds. However, Ekkehard of Aura's is probably the most likely version, as he is the only one who can rely on eyewitnesses who were survivors of the Battle of Heraclea Cybistra, whom Ekkehard met a few weeks later in Jaffa, while Albert von Aachen and the author of the Historia Welforum reported only after hearsay.

In fiction
Ida's fate is depicted in Beloved Pilgrim (2011) by Christopher Hawthorne.

Issue
Leopold III (1073–1136), who succeeded his father as Austrian margrave
Adelaide (d. after 1120), married Count Theoderic II of Formbach
Elizabeth (d. 1107), married Margrave Ottokar II of Styria
Gerberga (d. 1142), married Duke Bořivoj II of Bohemia
Ida, married the Přemyslid prince Luitpold of Znojmo
Euphemia, married Count Conrad I of Peilstein
Sophia (d. 1154), married Henry of Eppenstein, Duke of Carinthia from 1090 to 1122, and, secondly, Count Sieghard X of Burghausen

See also
Kilij Arslan II – who claimed blood cousinage with Henry the Lion.

Family tree

References

Sources
 Historia Welforum Weingartensis
 Runciman, Steven. A History of the Crusades, Vol. II
 Lechner Karl. Die Babenberger. Markgrafen und Herzoge von Österreich 976–1246, Böhlau Verlag Wien-Köln-Weimar 1992.

1050s births
1101 deaths
Year of birth uncertain
11th-century German nobility
11th-century women of the Holy Roman Empire
Women of medieval Austria
11th-century German women
Austrian royal consorts
Christians of the Crusade of 1101
Austrian people of German descent
People from Cham, Germany
Women in medieval European warfare
Women in 12th-century warfare